For the Italian grape of similar name, see Raboso.

Negron is a surname, and may refer to:

Chuck Negron (born 1942), American singer
Edna Negron Rosario (born 1944), American educator
Joe Negron (born 1961), member of the Florida House of Representatives
Kristopher Negrón (born 1986), American baseball player
Priscilla Negrón (born 1984), Ecuadorian actress
Taylor Negron (1957–2015), American stand-up comedian, actor, and artist